Sir Neville Arthur Pearson, 2nd Baronet (13 February 1898 – 6 November 1982) was a British newspaper publisher.

Born in Frensham, Surrey, he was the son of the British newspaper magnate Sir C. Arthur and Dame Ethel (Fraser) Pearson. His father, who was a journalist, died in 1921, whereupon he succeeded to the baronetage. He succeeded his father as publisher of a number of magazines (working for George Newnes Ltd in London, which had acquired C. Arthur Pearson Ltd as an imprint). From 1923 to 1953 his private secretary at George Newnes Ltd. was the British poet and novelist Stevie Smith.

He was married in 1922 to Hon. Mary Angela Mond, daughter of the Minister of Health Alfred Moritz Mond, 1st Baron Melchett. In 1928 he married the actress Gladys Cooper, but divorced her in 1936. Sir Neville and Lady Pearson had one daughter, Sally Pearson, a.k.a. Sally Cooper, who was married to actor Robert Hardy from 1961 to 1986.

In 1947 he succeeded his mother as president of St Dunstan's Hostel for the Blind, the home for blinded soldiers from World War I which his father, who had become blind himself, had founded in 1915.

Pearson died on 6 November 1982, aged 84. On his death, the baronetcy became extinct.

See also 
Pearson Baronets

Notes

References 
Pine, L. G.. Burke's Genealogical and Heraldic History of the Landed Gentry, 17th edition. London, England: Burke's Peerage Ltd, 1952.
 Photos of Neville Pearson

20th-century British newspaper publishers (people)
1898 births
1982 deaths
2nd
Baronets in the Baronetage of the United Kingdom